Péter István Mészáros (born 15 July 1943) is a Hungarian-American theoretical astrophysicist,
best known for the Mészáros effect
in cosmology and for his work on gamma-ray bursts.

Life 
Péter Mészáros was born in 1943 in Budapest, Hungary, and grew up in Liège, Belgium and Buenos Aires,
Argentina, where he did his undergraduate studies. He received his PhD in 1972 from the
University of California, Berkeley, and after postdoctoral fellowships at Princeton University
and Cambridge University he became a staff scientist at the Max Planck Institute for Astrophysics.
He joined the Pennsylvania State University in 1983, where for ten years he
was Head of the department of Astronomy and Astrophysics and Professor of Physics, being named
Eberly Chair Professor.

Career 
Mészáros is widely known in the astrophysical community for his papers on the relativistic fireball shock 
model of gamma ray bursts and their afterglows,
laying down the framework for the interplay between the jet dynamics and the external as
well as internal shocks which determine the observational aspects of these sources.
He is also known in the cosmological community for the Mészáros effect,
or Mészáros equation, which quantifies the influence of dark matter in the evolution of
the initial perturbations leading to large scale structures in cosmology.
He was active in the study of the interstellar medium as well as the astrophysics of black holes,
and contributed broadly to the study of magnetized neutron stars, e.g.
He served as the science-theory lead of the NASA Neil Gehrels Swift Observatory space mission.
His current interests include calculations of theoretical models of cosmic high energy cosmic ray
and neutrino sources, e.g.,
as well as exploring various aspects of multimessenger astrophysics.

Positions 
Mészáros is a Member of the US National Academy of Sciences (2021), Fellow of the American Academy of Arts and Sciences (2010),
Member of the Hungarian Academy of Sciences (2010),
Fellow of the American Physical Society (1996) and
Fellow of the American Astronomical Society (2019).
He is the Eberly Chair Professor Emeritus of Astronomy and Astrophysics and of Physics at
Penn State, and is currently the Director of its
Center for Multimessenger Astrophysics.

Awards 
2020 - Legacy Fellow, American Astronomical Society in 2020.
2013 – Einstein Professorship of the Chinese Academy of Sciences
2009 – Thomson Reuters scienceWATCH: Highest ranked in citations on gamma-ray bursts during 1999–2009
2007 – Bruno Rossi Prize (shared with Neil Gehrels and the Swift team)
2000 – Bruno Rossi Prize (shared with B. Paczynski and M.J. Rees)
1999 – Fellow, John Simon Guggenheim Foundation
1996 - Fellow, American Physical Society
1976 – First Prize, Gravity Research Foundation (shared with P. Kafka)

Personal life 
Mészáros is married to Deborah Mészáros, and they have an adult son, Andor Mészáros.

References

External links 
 Homepage: Péter Mészáros at Pennsylvania State University
 C.V. : Péter Mészáros
 Publications: Péter Mészáros
 ADS citations: Péter Mészáros

American astrophysicists
Living people
University of California, Berkeley alumni
Pennsylvania State University faculty
Fellows of the American Academy of Arts and Sciences
Members of the United States National Academy of Sciences
Members of the Hungarian Academy of Sciences
Fellows of the American Physical Society
Fellows of the American Astronomical Society
Institute for Advanced Study visiting scholars
People from Budapest
People from Buenos Aires
1943 births